Debenham is a large village and civil parish in the Mid Suffolk district of Suffolk in Eastern England.

Debenham may also refer to:

Places
 Debenham Islands, Antarctica
 Debenham Glacier, Antarctica
 Debenham Peak, Antarctica
 Debenham House, located in Holland Park, West London, England

People
 Debenham baronets
 Alison Debenham (1903–1967), British artist
 Ben Debenham (born 1967), English cricket umpire
 Christopher Debenham (born 1953), English cricketer
 Ernest Debenham (1865–1952), English businessman and politician
 Frank Debenham (1883–1965), English-Australian geographer
 Gilbert Debenham (1432–1500), English knight, politician and soldier
 Nigel Debenham (1978–1989), New Zealand footballer
 William Debenham (1794–1863), English businessman and founder of Debenhams

Fictional
 Mary Debenham, governess in Agatha Christie's novel Murder on the Orient Express

Other uses
 Debenhams, British retailer operating under a department store format
 Debenhams Cup, English football cup from 1977 to 1978
 Debenham LC F.C., located in Debenham, Suffolk